Queens Park Station is a railway station on the Transperth network. It is located on the Armadale/Thornlie Line, 11.4 kilometres from Perth Station serving the suburb of Queens Park, Western Australia.

History
Queens Park Station opened in 1899 as Woodlupine, being renamed Queens Park on 16 April 1912. In 2012, the station was refurbished.

Future
As part of a Metronet project for several level crossing removals on the Armadale line, Queens Park Station will be rebuilt as an elevated station and the Hamilton Street and Wharf Street level crossings will be replaced with elevated rail. The planned design has Queens Park Station about  closer to Hamilton Street, and the passenger car park underneath the elevated railway. The new station will initially be accessed via stairs and lifts, and its design will allow escalators and fare gates to be added in the future. The new station platforms will be side platforms, as opposed to the current island platforms. This is to reduce the impact of the bridge structure on the surrounding area. The platforms will also be built to the length of a six-car train, as opposed to the current station which only has a length of a four-car train.

Services
Queens Park Station is served by Transperth Armadale/Thornlie Line services.

The station saw 238,960 passengers in the 2013-14 financial year.

This station is also served by the twice daily B pattern which is meant as a school special

Platforms

References

External links

Gallery History of Western Australian Railways & Stations

Armadale and Thornlie lines
Railway stations in Perth, Western Australia
Railway stations in Australia opened in 1899